Longdongbao railway station is a railway station in Nanming District, Guiyang, Guizhou Province, People's Republic of China. It is situated underneath Guiyang Longdongbao International Airport, which it serves.

See also
Longdongbao International Airport station on Line 2 (Guiyang Metro)
Guiyang East railway station
Guiyang North railway station

References

External links

Railway stations in Guizhou
Railway stations in China opened in 2015
Airport railway stations in China